The 2007 FIFA U-20 World Cup was the 16th edition of the FIFA U-20 World Cup (formerly called the FIFA World Youth Championship), hosted by Canada from 30 June to 22 July 2007. Argentina defeated the Czech Republic in the title game by the score of 2–1, thus managing a back-to-back world title, its fifth in the past seven editions, and sixth overall. Argentine player Sergio Agüero was given the FIFA U-20 Golden Shoe (top scorer, with six goals) and the FIFA U-20 Golden Ball (best player of the tournament), while Japan earned the FIFA Fair Play Award.

The tournament featured 24 teams coming from six continental confederations; Canada qualified automatically as hosts, while the remaining teams qualified based on their rankings at the respective continental U-20 (U-19 in Europe's case) tournaments. UEFA (Europe) qualified six teams; AFC (Asia), CAF (Africa), CONCACAF (North, Central America and Caribbean) and CONMEBOL (South America) four teams each; and OFC (Oceania) one team.

The tournament took place in a variety of venues across the country – Toronto, Edmonton, Montreal, Ottawa, Victoria and Burnaby (Vancouver) – with the showcase stadium being Toronto's new National Soccer Stadium where the final match was held. 19 years later Canada will co-host the 2026 FIFA World Cup.

On 28 June 2007, two days before the inaugural match, it was reported that 950,000 tickets had been sold, making it the largest single-sport event ever taking place in the country, and on 3 July, the tournament organizers sold the millionth ticket. On 19 July, the semi-final match between Chile and Argentina marked this edition as the most attended in the tournament's history, with an accumulated attendance of 1,156,187 spectators, surpassing Mexico 1983's 1,155,160 spectators. Attendance totalled 1,195,299 after the final match.

Bids
Three countries launched bids to host the competition: Canada, Japan and South Korea. On August 6, 2004 the FIFA Emergency Committee unanimously awarded the rights to host the event to Canada over South Korea (Japan did not submit an official bid).

Venues

Qualification

Twenty-three teams qualified for the 2007 FIFA U-20 World Cup. As the host team, Canada received an automatic bid, bringing the total number of teams to twenty-four for the tournament. The final draw for the group stages took place on 3 March 2007 in Liberty Grand Entertainment Complex, Toronto.

1.Teams that made their debut.

Match officials

Squads
For a list of the squads see 2007 FIFA U-20 World Cup squads

Group stage

The 24 participating teams were distributed between six groups of four teams each, according to a draw held on 3 March 2007. The groups are contested on a league system, where each team plays one time against the other teams in the same group, for a total of six matches per group. Each group winner and runner-up teams, as well as the best four third-placed teams, qualify for the first round of the knockout stage (round of 16).

Group A

Group B

Group C

Group D

Group E

Group F

Ranking of third-placed teams

Knockout stages

Round of 16

Quarter-finals

Semi-finals

Match for third place

Final

Goalscorers
With six goals, Sergio Agüero is the top scorers in the tournament. In total, 135 goals were scored by 84 different players, with one of them credited as own goals.

6 goals
  Sergio Agüero

5 goals
  Adrián López

4 goals

  Maximiliano Moralez
  Jozy Altidore

3 goals

  Ángel Di María
  Erwin Hoffer
  Alexandre Pato
  Martin Fenin
  Luboš Kalouda
  Giovani dos Santos
  Dawid Janczyk
  Freddy Adu
  Danny Szetela

2 goals

  Mauro Zárate
  Rubin Okotie
  Leandro Lima
  Jaime Grondona
  Mauricio Isla
  Nicolás Medina
  Arturo Vidal
  Ousman Jallow
  Yasuhito Morishima
  Abdallah Deeb
  Pablo Barrera
  Ezekiel Bala
  Bruno Gama
  Shin Young-rok
  Juan Mata
  Edinson Cavani
  Luis Suárez
  Rodgers Kola

1 goal

  Claudio Yacob
  Sebastian Prödl
  Amaral
  Carlos Carmona
  Hans Martínez
  Alexis Sánchez
  Mathías Vidangossy
  Franchel Ibara
  Gracia Ikouma
  Ermejea Ngakosso
  Pablo Herrera
  Jonathan McDonald
  Ondřej Kúdela
  Jakub Mareš
  Tomáš Mičola
  Marek Střeštík
  Pierre Gomez
  Abdoulie Mansally
  Jun Aoyama
  Tomoaki Makino
  Atomu Tanaka
  Tsukasa Umesaki
  Lo'ay Omran
  Christian Bermúdez
  Omar Esparza
  Javier Hernández
  Héctor Moreno
  Osmar Mares
  Jack Pelter
  Chukwuma Akabueze
  Elderson Echiéjilé
  Brown Ideye
  Kim Kum-il
  Jon Kwang-ik
  Nelson Barahona
  Grzegorz Krychowiak
  Vitorino Antunes
  Feliciano Condesso
  Ross Campbell
  Mark Reynolds
  Lee Sang-ho
  Shim Young-sung
  Marquitos
  Alberto Bueno
  Diego Capel
  Javi García
  Gerard Piqué
  Mario Suárez
  Michael Bradley
  Clifford Mulenga
  William Njobvu
  Fwayo Tembo

1 own goal
  Mathías Cardaccio (against the United States)

Awards
Source:

Final ranking

Controversies

Nigerian accusations of racism
The quarter-final match between Chile and Nigeria took place on FIFA's "Say No To Racism Day." During extra time, Chile's Jaime Grondona scored at the 96th minute, but Nigerians claimed that it was offside. Despite their protest, referee Howard Webb allowed the goal to stand, and the goalkeeper Ikechukwu Ezenwa received a yellow card for his protest. Replays showed that a defender was out of place, and it was not offside.

After the game, Nigerian coach Ladan Bosso accused Webb of racism in a press conference, stating that "the officiating, I think FIFA has a long way to go to beat racism because that official showed racism." When asked directly if he felt Webb was a racist, Bosso responded by stating that "It's good for FIFA to bring in the fight against racism, but they have to follow it to the letter so that the implementation will be done." The coach was fined CHF 11,000 and banned for four months, as the disciplinary committee found him guilty of "offensive behaviour" under the terms of article 57 of the FIFA Disciplinary Code.

The Nigeria Football Federation (NFF) was also sanctioned for allowing the players to wear T-shirts with religious statements under their game jerseys. This was a violation of the regulations of the tournament, which state: "Players and officials are not allowed to display political, religious, commercial or personal messages in any language or form on their playing or team kits..."

Chilean clash with police
On 19 July 2007, there was a clash between Chilean players and police officers following the semi-final match between Chile and Argentina. The Chilean players were angry with referee, Wolfgang Stark, claiming that he had "lost control of the match early on" and complained about receiving seven yellow cards and two red cards, with a total of 53 fouls committed. After the game, Stark and his colleagues were surrounded by Chilean players, and Toronto Police Service members had to intervene to restrain them. Stark was escorted off the pitch and into the dressing room tunnel by the police, due to fears that he would be attacked by the crowd or Chilean players. Afterwards, there was a brawl between several players and delegates of the Chilean team and police outside Toronto's National Soccer Stadium.

According to Toronto Police Chief Bill Blair, the altercation began when Chilean players got into a scuffle with a rival fan. He added that "members of the Chilean team then decided to direct some of their aggressive behaviour towards my officers... The job of my officers was to respond in a firm, but fair, manner to end that violence. They are trained to do so, and that is what they did." The Chilean players, however, stated that Isaías Peralta walked towards Chilean fans located behind a security fence, but was stopped by about ten policemen. They further stated that a heated discussion took place, and Peralta (who speaks no English) was verbally and physically abused by the policemen.

Peralta was tasered by a police officer and lost consciousness for 20 minutes. Subsequently, other players became involved in a struggle with the police, but eventually returned to their bus and closed the doors. Eyewitnesses reported that players on the bus threw objects at the police through the windows and attempted to grab officers from inside the damaged bus. Three minutes later, Harold Mayne-Nicholls,  the president of the Chilean National Association of Professional Football (ANFP), asked the players to exit the bus and board a different one. As the players were leaving the bus, the police then took them back to the stadium.

FIFA spokesman, John Schumacher, stated that "the Chilean players were detained by the police to de-escalate the situation that was taking place in front of the stadium. Ten Chilean team members were detained over three hours and then released without charges." The following day, FIFA president Sepp Blatter expressed at a press conference in Toronto that the incident was "regrettable" and that he "apologised in the name of FIFA." The ANFP hired a Toronto-based law firm to pursue legal action against the Toronto police.

The incident was on the front page of every major Chilean newspaper. Following the incident, the Canadian embassy in Santiago received a bomb threat, and angry Chileans protested outside the embassy holding signs that read "Racist Canada." Chilean President Michelle Bachelet described the incident as "particularly serious because, in our view, the Chilean delegation suffered unjustified aggression" and lodged a formal protest with the Canadian government. In response, Canadian Prime Minister Stephen Harper remarked that "international soccer matches are hotly contested and often become very emotional. As you know, there are processes in Canada by which the authorities review these kinds of incidents and I don't intend to comment further."

According to reports in Canadian media, a Chilean team member punched a female police officer in the face before Peralta was tasered. An internal review led by Superintendent Jim Ramer determined that officers acted professionally and with "an immense amount of restraint" during the conflict outside BMO Field, in which Chilean players "punched, kicked, spat on, and kicked" police and security staff. The report stated that the violence began when two individuals not involved in the game confronted each other. Security guards attempted to intervene, followed by police, when a Chilean player punched a female police officer in the face. From that point, the report stated that the violence escalated, with Chilean players dismantling armrests and footrests from the bus seats and smashing windows in order to spit and throw objects at police, including D batteries, clothes hangers, and cans of deodorant. Four officers were reportedly injured by projectiles. FIFA agreed to pay for the $35,000 cost of damages to the team's rented bus.

Mayne-Nicholls, who was a witness to the incident, stated that "I didn't see any Chilean player hitting any officer except between all the struggling." Patricio Bascuñán, the president of the Salvador Allende Cultural Society of Toronto, called for an independent review.

Grondona was suspended for nine months at all levels, including domestic and international play, and fined CHF 7,000 (including procedural costs) for assaulting match officials. The Chilean football association was fined CHF 15,000 for "team misconduct."

See also
 Canadian Soccer Association
 2007 FIFA U-17 World Cup

References

External links

FIFA U-20 World Cup Canada 2007 , FIFA.com
RSSSF > FIFA World Youth Championship > 2007
FIFA Technical Report

 
FIFA U-20 World Cup tournaments
FIFA U-20 World Cup
International association football competitions hosted by Canada
Soccer in British Columbia
Soccer in Ontario
Soccer in Quebec
June 2007 sports events in Canada
July 2007 sports events in Canada
2007 in youth association football
International sports competitions in Toronto